The 2018 American Athletic Conference men's basketball tournament ended the 2017–18 season of the American Athletic Conference. It was held March 8–11, 2018, at the Amway Center in Orlando, Florida. Regular-season champion Cincinnati won the tournament and with it the league's automatic bid to the NCAA tournament.

Seeds
All 12 conference teams participated in the conference tournament. The top four teams received a bye into the quarterfinals. Teams were seeded by record within the conference, with a tiebreaker system to seed teams with identical conference records. Tiebreakers: win–loss record, head-to-head record, record against the highest ranked team outside of the tied teams, record against the second highest ranked team outside of the tied teams, etc.

Schedule

Bracket

References

American Athletic Conference men's basketball tournament
2017–18 American Athletic Conference men's basketball season
2018 in sports in Florida
College sports tournaments in Florida
Basketball competitions in Orlando, Florida